Union Sportive Monastirienne, commonly known as US Monastir, is a Tunisian professional basketball club based in Monastir. Established in 1959, the team plays in the Pro A the first division league in Tunisia and has won seven national championships. Monastir also plays in the Basketball Africa League (BAL) since the inaugural season in 2021.

Home games are played in the Mohamed-Mzali Sports Hall. 

US Monastir is one of the most decorated clubs in Tunisian basketball history, as the club has experienced recent success including winning 7 Tunisian Leagues and 4 Tunisian Cups. Monastir won the BAL championship in 2022, becoming the first Tunisian team to win the competition.

History
The club was established in 1959 and won its first Tunisian League title in 1998 after defeating Ezzahra Sports in the league finals. As the national champions, Monastir played in the Arab Club Basketball Championship where it lost all three group stage games. 

In the 1999–2000 season, Monastir won its first-ever double after winning both the league and cup title. Monastir beat Club Africain in the league final and Ezzahra in the cup final (66–61). 

In 2005, Monastir won its third Tunisian championship, defeating Stade Nabeulien 66–51.

The first international title for Monastir arrived in 2012, when they won the Maghreb Basketball Championship after defeating ES Radès in the final.

In 2014, Monastir made its debut in the FIBA Africa Club Championship, Africa's top continental league, for the first time. In 2017, the club ended at third place in the continental league.

In 2019 , Monastir won its fourth Tunisian championship defeating ES Rades.
again in 2020 US Monastir won its fifth Tunisian championship and the second in row defeating the same ES Rades. In 2021, Monastir defeated Ezzahra Sports in the Tunisian finals and won its sixth championship, and the third in a row.

In 2021, Monastir was one of the twelve teams to play in the new Basketball Africa League (BAL) as they qualified as Tunisian national champions. In the inaugural season of the league, Monastir reached the Finals where it lost to Zamalek despite being favourites in the competition. Three players of Monastir (Omar Abada, Makrem Ben Romdhane and Wael Arakji) were named to the All-BAL First Team.

In the following season, the 2021–22 season, Monastir won the national double after capturing the CNA and Tunisian Cup titles.
On 28 May 2022, Monastir won its first-ever BAL and African championship after defeating Petro de Luanda in the 2022 BAL Finals, becoming the first Tunisian team to win the BAL. Point guard Michael Dixon was named the league's MVP; Ater Majok and Radhouane Slimane were named to the All-BAL First Team. Representing the African continent, Monastir played in the 2023 edition of the FIBA Intercontinental Cup, where it finished in fourth place after losing to the Spanish team CB Canarias and the American team Rio Grande Valley Vipers.

Arenas

Since its opening in 2006, Monastir plays its home games in the Mohamed-Mzali Sports Hall, which has a capacity of 4,075–5,000 people.

Players

Current roster
As of 8 February 2023.

Past rosters
2021 BAL season
2022 BAL season

Notable players

Individual awards

Honours

National competitions

Leagues 
Tunisian League
Champions (7): 1997–98, 1999–2000, 2004–05, 2018–19, 2019–20, 2020–21, 2021–22
Runner-up (1): 2017–18

Cups 
Tunisian Cup
Champions (4): 2000, 2020, 2021, 2022
Runner-up (9): 1992, 1998, 1999, 2001, 2005, 2015, 2016, 2017, 2019
Tunisian Supercup
Runner-up (1): 2005
Tunisian Federation Cup
Champion (1): 2012

International competitions 
Basketball Africa League
Champion (1): 2022
Runner-up (1): 2021
FIBA Africa Clubs Champions Cup
Third place (1): 2017
Arab Club Basketball Championship 
Third place (1): 2019
Maghreb Championship
Champion (1): 2012
FIBA Intercontinental Cup
Fourth Place (1): 2023

Season by season

Head coaches 
The following people have been head coach of US Monastir (since 2009):

References

External links 
 U.S. Monastir at Eurobasket.com

Basketball teams established in 1959
Basketball teams in Tunisia
Basketball Africa League teams
Monastir Governorate